Wortley Hall is a former stately home in the small South Yorkshire village of Wortley, located south of Barnsley, England. For more than six decades the hall has been owned by individual members and organisations associated with the British trade union and wider labour movement. It is currently used by several trades unions and other organisations as a venue for residential training courses and other meetings, as well as for purely social gatherings and is run as a non profit co-operative.

The building is constructed of sandstone ashlar with graduated slate roofs to an irregular floor plan, mostly in 2 storeys with a 7-bay south front.

The hall is a licensed venue for wedding and civil partnership ceremonies, and is open to day visitors who wish to explore its formal gardens and extensive grounds.

History

A manor house at Wortley was rebuilt by Sir Richard Wortley in 1586. During the English Civil War his son Sir Francis Wortley, 1st Baronet, like his powerful ally Sir Thomas Wentworth of Wentworth Woodhouse, was a Royalist and fought for the King, allowing Wortley Hall to be used as a garrison for 150 dragoons. However, in 1644 Sir Francis was captured and imprisoned in the Tower of London and on his release in 1649 obliged to pay a heavy fine to recover his property. Wortley then eventually descended to an illegitimate daughter who married Sidney Montagu, second son of Edward Montagu, 1st Earl of Sandwich, c.1670.

The Hall was significantly remodelled by Giacomo Leoni in 1742–46 and the East Wing added in 1757–61 for Sir Edward Wortley Montagu, MP and Ambassador to the Ottoman Empire who died in 1761. The builder of this section was John Platt of Rotherham.

Montagu left the Wortley Hall estate to his daughter Mary. In 1735 she had eloped with John Stuart, 3rd Earl of Bute, who later became Prime Minister. From her it passed in 1794 to their son, Colonel James Archibald Stuart (1747–1818), who added the surname Wortley to his own and later also added Mackenzie. He left the estate to his son Colonel James Archibald Stuart-Wortley-Mackenzie (1776–1845) who was one of the two MPs for Yorkshire from 1818 to 1826, when he was created Baron Wharncliffe.

Edward Montagu-Stuart-Wortley-Mackenzie, 3rd Baron Wharncliffe was created Earl of Wharncliffe in 1876. The Hall was the seat of the Earls of Wharncliffe until the Second World War, when it was used by the British Army, after which its structural condition deteriorated.

In 1950, a group of local trade union activists identified the hall as a possible educational and holiday centre, and established a co-operative which succeeded in purchasing the hall for those purposes. It was formally opened on 5 May 1951.

In 1980, the hall was used as the setting of the country estate in the Ken Loach TV film The Gamekeeper.

The hall was highlighted in series six, episode 12 of Great British Railway Journeys by Michael Portillo on BBC Two on 20 January 2015. Michael Portillo described its current role, met the general manager and stayed the night. He showed the links to trade unionism.

See also
Grade II* listed buildings in South Yorkshire
Listed buildings in Wortley, South Yorkshire
Earl of Wharncliffe

References

External links

Wortley Hall website
Friends of Wortley Hall Gardens

Country houses in South Yorkshire
Buildings and structures in the Metropolitan Borough of Barnsley
Tourist attractions in Barnsley
Co-operatives in the United Kingdom
Grade II* listed buildings in South Yorkshire
Wortley, South Yorkshire